Marco Achilli (9 December 1948 – 22 September 2009) was an Italian footballer who played as a midfielder for a number of Italian sides, including Inter Milan, Monza, Livorno and Albese. His father was Camillo Achilli.

References

External links
 

1948 births
2009 deaths
A.C. Monza players
U.S. Livorno 1915 players
Inter Milan players
Association football midfielders
Italian footballers
Footballers from Milan